Valoreille is a commune in the Doubs department in the Bourgogne-Franche-Comté region in eastern France.

Geography 
It occupies the slope from the Dessoubre to the outlook of Montaigue, with its remarkable view of the Ballon d'Alsace and the gorge of the Dessoubre.

Population

See also
 Communes of the Doubs department

References

External links

 Valoreille on the regional Web site 

Communes of Doubs